Frisco is a home rule municipality located in Summit County, Colorado, United States. The town population was 2,913 at the 2020 United States Census. Frisco is a part of the Breckenridge, CO Micropolitan Statistical Area. It is a popular town among skiers from around the world. Four major ski resorts are located in close proximity to Frisco: Copper Mountain, Breckenridge, Keystone, and Arapahoe Basin.

History
Founded in 1873 (officially chartered in 1879) by Henry Recen, Frisco was built because of the Colorado Silver Boom, which began in 1879. Frisco was incorporated in 1880. The town's name does not come from the popular nickname for the city of San Francisco, California, but is rather named after the popular Frisco Lines Railroad in hopes of it bringing the rail line to the town.

Geography
At the 2020 United States Census, the town had a total area of  including  of water. Frisco is located along the coast Lake Dillon, a reservoir constructed between 1961 and 1963 that now covers the original town of Dillon. Across the water to the east are the new town of Dillon, Silverthorne, and Keystone. To the southeast is Breckenridge.

Demographics

As of the census of 2000, there were 2,443 people, 1,053 households, and 527 families residing in the town. The racial makeup of the town was 96.36% White, 0.08% African American, 0.20% Native American, 0.90% Asian, 0.61% from other races, and 1.84% from two or more races. Hispanic or Latino of any race were 3.48% of the population.

There were 1,053 households, out of which 18.1% had children under the age of 18 living with them, 42.7% were married couples living together, 3.7% had a female householder with no husband present, and 49.9% were non-families. 23.9% of all households were made up of individuals, and 2.5% had someone living alone who was 65 years of age or older.  The average household size was 2.32 and the average family size was 2.66.

In the town, the population was spread out, with 14.2% under the age of 18, 12.6% from 18 to 24, 44.9% from 25 to 44, 23.2% from 45 to 64, and 5.0% who were 65 years of age or older.  The median age was 33 years. For every 100 females, there were 137.6 males.  For every 100 females age 18 and over, there were 139.0 males.

The median income for a household in the town was $62,267, and the median income for a family was $70,556. Males had a median income of $36,989 versus $29,766 for females. The per capita income for the town was $31,232.  About 1.7% of families and 7.2% of the population were below the poverty line, including 5.0% of those under age 18 and 9.6% of those age 65 and older.

Arts and culture
Frisco was the location of the first official state BBQ challenge in 1993. The event is held annually, and benefits non-profits. In the last fifteen years (to 2012), the event has raised over $500,000.

Infrastructure
Intercity transportation is provided by both Bustang and Summit Stage. Frisco is along Bustang's West Line, which goes from Denver to Grand Junction and back. Summit Stage provides free transportation between Silverthorn, Frisco, Breckenridge, and others.

Notable people
 Michelle Black, novelist
 Jon Kreamelmeyer (1947- ), skier, coach

Sister cities 

 Nishikawa, Yamagata, Japan - since August 29, 1990

See also

Dillon Reservoir
Frisco Schoolhouse in the Frisco Historic Park
Gore Range
Tenmile Range
White River National Forest

References

External links

Town of Frisco website

Towns in Summit County, Colorado
Towns in Colorado